Pickardt syndrome  denotes a rare form of tertiary hypothyroidism that is caused by interruption of the portal veins connecting hypothalamus and pituitary.It was characterized in 1972 and 1973 by Renate Pickardt and Rudolf Fahlbusch.

Signs and symptoms

Cause
Interruption of the portal system may be caused by tumors compressing the infundibulum. Other causes for Pickardt's syndrome are inflammatory disorders and traumatic brain injury. An inborn variant of Pickardt's syndrome that is associated with certain mutations (HESX1 or LHX4) is referred to as pituitary stalk interruption syndrome (PSIS).

Endocrine consequences
Typical manifestations of Pickardt–Fahlbusch syndrome are hypothyroidism with reduced TSH values and functional hyperprolactinemia (which is caused by disinhibition of prolactin release). Other endocrine disorders that are usually associated with Pickardt syndrome are suprasellar failures like secondary hypogonadism, reduced levels of growth hormone and, in more severe cases, secondary adrenal insufficiency.

Diagnosis
Pickardt's syndrome may cause difficulties in differential diagnosis of pituitary adenomas, as both suprasellar hormone-inactive adenomas and prolactinomas may be associated with increased prolactin levels, central hypogonadism and central hypothyroidism. Usually, the prolactin levels are higher in case of a true prolactinoma, but the concentration ranges overlap.

Treatment
Treatment modality depends on the cause. Tumors may be removed surgically, but pituitary stalk interruption may persist. Usually, replacement of those hormones that are reduced due to failed feedback control systems will be necessary.

References

External links 

Endocrine diseases
Diseases named for discoverer